Holmberg is a Swedish surname formed from the words holm(e) meaning islet and berg meaning mountain. It is a relatively common name, at least in Sweden, which has to do with the fact that many Swedish place names contain the suffixes -holm, -holmen or -berg, -berga, -berget. Notable people with the surname include:

 Åke Holmberg (1907–1991), Swedish author and translator
 Krister Holmberg (born 1946), professor of Surface Chemistry at Chalmers University of Technology
 Anne Holmberg (born 1938), American writer of historical romance novels
 Arvid Holmberg (1886–1958), Swedish gymnast who competed in the 1908 Summer Olympics
 Barbro Holmberg (born 1952), Swedish Social Democratic politician
 Birgit Agda Holmberg (born 1921), Swedish revue director, actress and singer
 Bo Holmberg (1942–2010), Swedish politician, widower of former Swedish Minister for Foreign Affairs Anna Lindh (1957–2003)
 Britta Holmberg (1921–2004), Swedish film actress
 Carl Holmberg (1884–1909), Swedish gymnast who competed in the 1908 Summer Olympics
 Carl-Erik Holmberg, Swedish football player active in the 1920s
 Dennis Holmberg (born 1951), American minor league baseball player and major league coach
 Eduard Ladislas Kaunitz, baron von Holmberg (1778–1853), Austrian military officer who joined the Argentine revolutionary forces
 Eduardo Ladislao Holmberg (1852–1937), Argentine natural historian and novelist
 Elena Holmberg (1931–1978), assassinated Argentine diplomat
 Erik Holmberg (astronomer) (1908–2000), Swedish astronomer
 Erik Holmberg (football player) (1922–1998), Norwegian football player active in the 1950s
 Erik Holmberg (singer) (born 1970), musician in Swedish band Dive and music producer
 Erik Holmberg, director of the Swedish Institute at Athens (1947–1948)
 Gunnar Holmberg (1897–1975), Swedish football player who competed in the 1924 Summer Olympics
 Henric Holmberg (born 1946), Swedish actor, director and scriptwriter
 Henrik Holmberg (born 1963), Swedish curler
 Henrik Johan Holmberg or Heinrich Johann Holmberg (1818–1864), Finnish naturalist, geologist and ethnographer
 John-Henri Holmberg (born 1949), Swedish author, critic, publisher and translator
 Joyce Holmberg (1930-2017), American educator and politician
 Kari Lise Holmberg (born 1951), Norwegian politician for the Conservative Party
 N. J. Holmberg (1878-1951), American farmer and politician
 Nils Holmberg (1902–1981), communist leader in Sweden
 Oswald Holmberg (1882–1969), Swedish gymnast and tug of war competitor
 Per Holmberg, passenger, SAS flight captain and survivor of the Scandinavian Airlines Flight 751 crash
 Peter Holmberg (born 1960), sailor from the U.S. Virgin Islands
 Rob Holmberg (born 1971), American football linebacker
 Rolf Holmberg (1914–1979), Norwegian football player who competed in the 1936 Summer Olympics
 Ronald Holmberg (born 1938), American tennis instructor
 Tobias Holmberg (born 1987), Swedish Bandy midfielder
 Matt Holmberg (born 1979), American  Game Artist

See also
 Holmberg IX, a dwarf irregular galaxy and a satellite galaxy of M81
 3573 Holmberg, a Main-belt asteroid discovered on August 16, 1982

Swedish-language surnames